Lala Ram Ken (24 November 1931 − 5 October 2007) was a political leader who was elected Member of Parliament twice from Bayana Constituency for 7th and 8th Lok Sabha (Parliament).

Personal life
Lala Ram Ken was born in Bharatpur, Rajasthan. He was from Jatav community. He completed his high school from Government High School, Bharatpur and worked as contractor and Agriculturist also. He was member of Sardar Club, Bharatpur.

Political life
He held following positions during his political life:
President, City Congress Committee, Bharatpur
President, Jatav Samiti, Bharatpur
GN.Sec.,Congress Committee, Bharatpur

Members of Parliament
 7th Lok Sabha, 1979:Indian National Congress, Constituency: Bayana, Rajasthan
 8th Lok Sabha, 1984:Indian National Congress, Constituency: Bayana, Rajasthan

References 
 https://web.archive.org/web/20081210184556/http://www.rajivgandhi.in/website/page109-1.htm
 http://www.parliamentofindia.nic.in/ls/lok07/state/07lsrj.htm
 http://parliamentofindia.nic.in/ls/lok08/state/08lsrj.htm

2007 deaths
Indian National Congress politicians
Rajasthani politicians
India MPs 1980–1984
India MPs 1984–1989
1931 births
Lok Sabha members from Rajasthan
People from Bharatpur, Rajasthan